Tinworth is an English surname.

List of people with the surname 

 Adam Tinworth (born 1971), British journalist and writer
 George Tinworth (1843–1913), English ceramic artist

See also 
 Tinworth, a fictional Cornish village, the location of Shell Cottage in J. K. Rowling's Harry Potter and the Deathly Hallows

English-language surnames
Surnames of English origin
Surnames of British Isles origin